AAIC may refer to:

 Alzheimer's Association International Conference, see Alzheimer's Association#International Conference
 Aircraft Accident Investigation Commission, government agency, Japan
 Aircraft Accident Investigation Committee, government agency, Thailand